Piercetown is a townland in County Westmeath, Ireland. The townland  is in the civil parish of Castlelost. The town of Tyrrellspass lies to the south-west, and Rochfortbridge is to the east. Bordering townlands include Meedin to the west, Castlelost West to the east, Gneevebane to the south and Kilbrennan to the north.

References 

Townlands of County Westmeath